The women's 4 × 400 metres relay event at the 2006 African Championships in Athletics was held at the Stade Germain Comarmond on August 13.

Results

References
Results 
Results

2006 African Championships in Athletics
Relays at the African Championships in Athletics
2006 in women's athletics